SWI/SNF complex subunit SMARCC2 is a protein that in humans is encoded by the SMARCC2 gene.

Function 

The protein encoded by this gene is a member of the SWI/SNF family of proteins, whose members display helicase and ATPase activities and which are thought to regulate transcription of certain genes by altering the chromatin structure around those genes. The encoded protein is part of the large ATP-dependent chromatin remodeling complex SNF/SWI and contains a predicted leucine zipper motif typical of many transcription factors. Two transcript variants encoding different isoforms have been found for this gene.

Interactions 

SMARCC2 has been shown to interact with BAZ1B and SMARCA4.

References

Further reading

External links